This is a list of characters in animation that either self-identify as bisexual or have been identified by outside parties to be bisexual. Listed characters are either recurring characters, cameos, guest stars, or one-off characters. This article does not include any characters in Japanese animation, otherwise known as anime. There are also corresponding lists of lesbian and gay animated characters.

For fictional characters in other parts of the LGBTQ community, see the lists of gay, trans, lesbian, non-binary, pansexual, asexual, and intersex characters.

The names are organized alphabetically by surname (i.e. last name), or by a single name if the character does not have a surname. If more than two characters are in one entry, the last name of the first character is used.

In the 1990s

In the 2000s

In the 2010s

In the 2020s

See also

 List of bisexual characters in television
 The Bisexual Option
 List of polyamorous characters in fiction
 List of animated series with LGBTQ characters
 List of comedy television series with LGBT characters
 List of dramatic television series with LGBT characters: 1970s–2000s
 List of dramatic television series with LGBT characters: 2010s
 List of LGBT characters in television and radio

Notes

References

Citations

Sources
 
  See the overview page here.
 

bisexual
Bisexual in animation